"There Goes My Everything" is a popular song written by Dallas Frazier and published in 1965. "There Goes My Everything" is now considered a country music standard, covered by many artists.

Jack Greene recording
The song is best known in a 1966 version by Jack Greene whose version spent seven weeks at the top of the US country music chart, with a total of twenty-one weeks on the chart. It peaked at 65 on the Billboard Hot 100. The song also won several awards, including "Single of the Year" and "Song of the Year" at the first CMA Awards presentation.  In addition, the accompanying album of the same title won "Album of the Year", and Greene won "Male Vocalist of the Year".

Content
The song is about a couple who are splitting up, but why is a mystery. The singer says that he can hear a voice refer to him as "darling", which seems an unlikely address when a couple are bitterly splitting up.  The song describes the narrator's feelings as his lover is leaving him.  He comes to realize how much she meant to him now that he is losing her — "There goes my reason for living/There goes the one of my dreams/There goes my only possession/There goes my everything".

Chart performance

Cover versions
 In 1967, Engelbert Humperdinck hit No. 20 on the Billboard Hot 100 with his version of the song, No. 2 on the UK Singles Chart and No. 2 in Ireland.
 In 1971, Elvis Presley hit the top ten on the country charts with his version which is also featured on the album Elvis Country (I'm 10,000 Years Old). Presley's version also reached No. 6 in the UK chart.

References

1966 singles
1967 singles
Don Cherry songs
Jack Greene songs
Elvis Presley songs
Ferlin Husky songs
Engelbert Humperdinck songs
Songs written by Dallas Frazier
Song recordings produced by Owen Bradley
1965 songs
Decca Records singles